Bird Without Wings is a 1997 album by Diary of Dreams.

Track listing

Credits
 Artwork – Andreas Gantenhammer
 Guitar – Alistair Kane (tracks: 1 to 9)
 Mastered By – Adrian Hates, Rainer Assmann
 Mastered By [Pre-mastering] – Christian Zimmerli
 Photography By – Silke Jochum
 Producer, Written-By, Performer, Arranged By, Recorded By – Adrian Hates
 Recorded at ACCESS-Sound Engineering/A.M.P. Studio in 1996/1997
 Mastered at Ton in Ton Studio in Düsseldorf (Germany)/A.M.P. Studio

References

1997 albums
Diary of Dreams albums